Myeik Airport is an airport in Myeik, Myanmar .

Airlines and destinations

References

Airports in Myanmar